There are many venues in the United Kingdom where a variety of national and international sport, musical and entertainment acts perform.

Stadiums and festivals

Indoor arenas

 AO Arena, Manchester – 21,000
 The O2 Arena, London 20,000
 Earls Court Exhibition Centre (1887–2014), London 20,000
 Utilita Arena Birmingham (formerly Barclaycard Arena/NIA), Birmingham 16,000
 P&J Live, Aberdeen – 16,000
 Resorts World Arena (formerly Genting Arena, LG Arena, NEC Arena), Birmingham 13,928 to 15,643
 First Direct Arena, Leeds 13,500
 Utilita Arena Sheffield, Sheffield 13,500
 OVO Hydro, Glasgow 13,000
 OVO Arena Wembley (formerly Empire Pool), London 12,500
 London Arena (1989–2006), London 12,500
 SEC Centre, Glasgow 12,500
 Utilita Arena Newcastle, Newcastle upon Tyne  11,000
 M&S Bank Arena, Liverpool  11,000; ECHO 2  4000; the auditorium  1350
 Motorpoint Arena Nottingham, Nottingham 10,000
 Cardiff International Arena, Cardiff 7,500 (standing), 5,000 (seated)
 Copper Box Arena, London 7,500
 Lee Valley VeloPark, London 7,000

Exhibition and conference venues
 Farnborough International Exhibition & Conference Centre, Farnborough - 12,000 (Hall 1), 3,150 (Hall 5)
 National Exhibition Centre, Birmingham – 12,000 (Hall 4), 8,000 (Hall 5)
 Manchester Central Convention Complex – 10,900 (Halls 1 and 2 combined), 8,100 (Hall 2)
 Great Hall, Alexandra Palace, London 10,250 (standing), 7,250 (seated)
 Coventry Building Society Arena – 10,000 (standing), 7,000 (seated)
 Great Hall, Olympia London – 10,000 (standing), 4,000 (seated)
 EventCity, Manchester – 9,360 (Hall 3), 4,500 (Hall 4)
 Exhibition Centre Liverpool – 7,000 (standing, combined halls), 2,400 (per hall)
 ExCeL London – 5,000 (ICC Auditorium), 65,000 (event halls)

Indoor theatres and halls

Smaller venues
(including public houses)

 606 Club, London - 120
 Vortex Jazz Club, London - 100

Capacities not specified
 Theatre Royal, Drury Lane, London
 Kilburn National Club, London
 Marquee Club, London (Wardour Street 1964–1988; Charing Cross Road 1988–2001)
 Powerhaus (was once The Pied Bull; closed circa 1990s; now Halifax Building Society), Islington, London
 The Sir George Robey, Finsbury Park (briefly renamed Powerhaus after Islington venue "moved" here) (closed circa 2000s), London
 Camden Falcon, London (closed circa 1990s)
 Rainbow Theatre, London (1971–1982; now a Christian church)
 The Roxy, London (1976–1978; now a sports shop)
 Music Room Space Events, Mayfair, London
 Band on the Wall, Manchester
 Hope and Anchor, Islington, London

See also 

 List of London venues

References

Venues
United Kingdom